The Goriya  are a Hindu caste found in the states of Bihar and Uttar Pradesh in India. Those found in the Basti Division of eastern Uttar Pradesh have converted to Islam, and now form a distinct community of Muslim Goriya. A small number of Goriya are also found in the Terai region of Nepal.

Origin 

The Goriya are a sub-caste of the Mallaah community, and they are traditional ferrymen of the Ganges. According to their traditions, the community ferried the god Ram on his way to Chitrakut. Like other Mallaahs, they trace their ancestry to Nishad Raj, a figure that appears in the Ramayana. They are found mainly in the districts of Faizabad, Jaunpur, Varanasi and Sultanpur. The Goriya speak both Hindi and Awadhi.

Present circumstances 

Traditionally, the Goriya were fishermen and ferrymen. But like other communities of a similar background such as the Kewat and Pankhiya have had to give up their traditional occupation. Many are now farmers, but as their villages are near the Ganges, they are prone to flooding. With the recent electrification of their villages, they are now able to use tube wells as a means of irrigation. The Goriya are Hindu, and have no particular deities.

The Goriya of the Basti Division in eastern Uttar Pradesh are Muslim. They claim to have been converted at the time of the rule of Sher Shah Suri. Like their Hindu counterparts, the Muslim Goriya are now mainly farmers. They are entirely Sunni, and speak the Awadhi dialect. The Muslim Goriya are strictly endogamous, and marry within close kin.

References 

Social groups of Uttar Pradesh
Indian castes
Social groups of Bihar
Fishing communities in India
Social groups of Madhya Pradesh
Muslim communities of Uttar Pradesh

In the Goriya Community, after marriage, girls are given twenty-one snakes as gifts